The Northumberland Regiment was an infantry regiment of the Non-Permanent Active Militia of the Canadian Militia (now the Canadian Army). In 1936, the regiment was amalgamated with The Durham Regiment to form The Midland Regiment (which now forms part of The Hastings and Prince Edward Regiment).

Lineage 
 Originated on 5 October 1866, in Cobourg, Canada West, as the 40th Northumberland Battalion of Infantry
 Redesignated on 8 May 1900, as the 40th Northumberland Regiment
 Redesignated on 12 March 1920, as The Northumberland (Ontario) Regiment
 Redesignated on 15 May 1924, as The Northumberland Regiment
 Amalgamated on 15 December 1936, with The Durham Regiment and Redesignated as The Midland Regiment (Northumberland and Durham)

Perpetuations 

 39th Battalion, CEF
 139th (Northumberland) Battalion, CEF

History

Early history 
With the passing of the Militia Act of 1855, the first of a number of newly raised independent militia companies were established in and around the Northumberland County region of Canada West (now the Province of Ontario).

On 5 October 1866, the 40th Northumberland Battalion of Infantry was authorized for service by the regimentation of six of these previously authorized independent militia rifle and infantry companies. Its Regimental Headquarters was located at Cobourg and had companies at Cobourg, Campbellford, Brighton, Cold Springs, Grafton, Colborne, Castleton and Warkworth, Ontario.

North West Rebellion 
On 10 April 1885, the 40th Northumberland Battalion of Infantry mobilized a company for active service with The Midland Battalion where it served in the Alberta Column of the North West Field Force. On 24 July 1885, the company was removed from active service.

Early 1900s 
On 8 May 1900, the 40th Northumberland Battalion of Infantry was redesignated as the 40th Northumberland Regiment.

Great War 
On 7 November 1914, the 39th Battalion, CEF was authorized for service and on 17 June 1915, the battalion embarked for Great Britain. After its arrival in the UK, the battalion provided reinforcements to the Canadian Corps in the field. On 4 January 1917, the battalion's personnel were absorbed by the 6th Reserve Battalion, CEF.

On 22 December 1915, the 139th (Northumberland) Battalion, CEF was authorized for service and on 27 September 1916, the battalion embarked for Great Britain. After its arrival in the UK, on 6 October 1916, the battalion's personnel were absorbed by the 36th Reserve Battalion, CEF to provide reinforcements to the Canadian Corps in the field. On 21 May 1917, the 139th Battalion, CEF was disbanded.

1920s-1930s 
On 15 March 1920, as a result of the Otter Commission and the following post-war reorganization of the militia, the 40th Northumberland Regiment was redesignated as The Northumberland (Ontario) Regiment and was reorganized with two battalions (one of them a paper-only reserve battalion) to perpetuate the assigned war-raised battalions of the Canadian Expeditionary Force.

On 15 May 1924, the regiment was redesignated for the final time as The Northumberland Regiment.

As a result of the 1936 Canadian Militia Reorganization, on 15 December 1936, The Northumberland Regiment was amalgamated with The Durham Regiment to form The Midland Regiment (Northumberland and Durham).

Organization

40th Northumberland Battalion of Infantry (5 October 1866) 

 Regimental Headquarters (Cobourg, Canada West)
 No. 1 Company (Cobourg) (first raised on 24 January 1856 as the 1st Volunteer Militia Rifle Company of Cobourg)
 No. 2 Company (Cobourg) (first raised on 6 February 1863 as the Volunteer Militia Company of Infantry)
 No. 3 Company (Campbellford) (first raised on 30 January 1863 as a Volunteer Militia Company of Infantry)
 No. 4 Company (Brighton) (first raised on 20 July 1866 as an Infantry Company)
 No. 5 Company (Cold Springs) (first raised on 17 August 1866 as an Infantry Company)
 No. 6 Company (Grafton) (first raised on 17 August 1866 as an Infantry Company)

The Northumberland (Ontario) Regiment (15 September 1920) 

 1st Battalion (perpetuating the 139th Battalion, CEF)
 2nd (Reserve) Battalion (perpetuating the 235th Battalion, CEF)

Alliances 
 - The Royal Northumberland Fusiliers (Until 1936)

Battle honours 

 Mount Sorrel
 Somme, 1916
 Arras, 1917, '18
 Hill 70
 Ypres, 1917
 Amiens
 Hindenburg Line
 Pursuit to Mons

Notable members 

 Lieutenant Wallace Lloyd Algie

Notes and references 

Midland Regiment
Former infantry regiments of Canada
Military units and formations of Ontario
Military units and formations established in 1866
Military units and formations disestablished in 1936